Karl Jesper Karlsson (born 25 July 1998) is a Swedish professional footballer who plays as a forward for Eredivisie club AZ and the Sweden national team.

Club career

Early career 
Karlsson started playing in IF Böljan from the age of four. At the age of 14, he received his first-team debut for the club in Division 4. Before the 2015 season, he moved to Falkenbergs FF, and he was offered a first-team contract in the autumn. In November 2015, Karlsson signed a first team contract that extends over the season 2018 with Falkenberg FF. Before he signed the contract, he had also served and trained with English Brighton & Hove Albion.

Falkenbergs FF 
The premiere of the headlines in 2016 were about Karlsson making his Allsvenskan debut. In the 79th minute he was replaced in instead of Akseli Pelvas, in the match Falkenbergs FF lost 2–0 to IFK Göteborg. On 17 July 2016, Karlsson scored his first two Allsvenskan goals in a 3–3 win against Hammarby IF. In total, he scored seven goals and made two assists during the 2016 season.

IF Elfsborg 
Karlsson transferred from Falkenbergs FF to Swedish top flight IF Elfsborg on 2 December 2016 for a fee of €450,000.

AZ 
On 11 September 2020, Karlsson signed a five-year contract with Dutch Eredivisie club AZ Alkmaar. However, the teams agreed that he stayed at Elfsborg until 28 September. After arriving in Alkmaar, he made his debut on 4 October 2020 in a 4–4 draw against Sparta Rotterdam, in which he provided two assists.

International career 
In September 2015, Karlsson made his debut in the Sweden national under-19. He has also represented the Sweden U21 team.

He made his full international debut for Sweden on 9 January 2020 in a friendly game against Moldova.

Career statistics

Club

International

Honours
Individual
Allsvenskan Striker of the Year: 2020
Eredivisie Player of the Month: December 2021
Eredivisie Team of the Month: December 2021

References

External links 
 
 Jesper Karlsson: whoscored.com

1998 births
Living people
Association football forwards
Swedish footballers
Sweden international footballers
Sweden under-21 international footballers
Sweden youth international footballers
Swedish expatriate footballers
Falkenbergs FF players
IF Elfsborg players
AZ Alkmaar players
Allsvenskan players
Eredivisie players
Expatriate footballers in the Netherlands
Swedish expatriate sportspeople in the Netherlands
People from Falkenberg
Sportspeople from Halland County